The European Congress of Mathematics (ECM) is the second largest international conference of the mathematics community, after the International Congresses of Mathematicians (ICM).

The ECM are held every four years and are timed precisely between the ICM. The ECM is held under the auspices of the European Mathematical Society (EMS), and was one of its earliest initiatives. It was founded by Max Karoubi and the first edition took place in Paris in 1992.

Its objectives are "to present various new aspects of pure and applied mathematics to a wide audience, to be a forum for discussion of the relationship between mathematics and society in Europe, and to enhance cooperation among mathematicians from all European countries."

Activities 
The Congresses generally last a week and consist of plenary lectures, parallel (invited) lectures and several mini-symposia devoted to a particular subject, where participants can contribute with posters and short talks. Many editions featured also special lectures, e.g. by prize winners, and public sessions aimed at a general audience.

Other mathematics conferences and workshops organised in the same period become often satellite events of the ECM.

Prizes 

Several prizes are awarded at the beginning of the Congress:

 The EMS Prize (awarded since the first edition in 1992), to up to ten young mathematicians of European nationality or working in Europe
 The Felix Klein Prize (awarded since 2000), to at most three young applied mathematicians
 The Otto Neugebauer Prize (awarded since 2012) to a researcher in history of mathematics

List of congresses 

 1st edition – Paris (1992)
 2nd edition – Budapest (1996)
 3rd edition – Barcelona (2000)
 4th edition – Stockholm (2004)
 5th edition – Amsterdam (2008)
 6th edition – Kraków (2012)
 7th edition – Berlin (2016)
 8th edition – Portorož (2021)

The 9th European Congress of Mathematics will be held in Seville in 2024.

References

Recurring events established in 1992
Mathematics conferences
Math
Quadrennial events